Orph is a three-song demo that was released by the band Dredg in 1997.

About the album 
Drummer Dino Campanella says, "Our first two recordings were written to be rhythmically aggressive. We did the third one, Orph, because we wanted to grow up the right way, from our roots with harmony and melody." Singer Gavin Hayes explains the heavier sound of Orph compared to later releases: "Heavy music back then to me was a little more rebellious. It wasn't so mainstream at the time. You used to have to wait for MTV's Headbanger's Ball to see anything of the sort. It's just different now, and that's kind of why we steered away from it. This was just a natural progression."

Track listing

Personnel 
Dredg – producer
Brian Lillie – producer
Gavin Hayes – vocals
Mark Engles – guitar
Drew Roulette – bass
Dino Campanella – percussion, drums
Travis Crenshaw – engineer, mixing
Jim Andrews – assistant engineer
Michael Romanowski – mastering
Beau Roulette – photography
Dredg – art production

External links 
Analysis of Orph

Dredg albums
1997 EPs